Oxwich Castle is a Grade I listed castle which occupies a position on a wooded headland overlooking Oxwich Bay on the Gower Peninsula, Wales. Although it may occupy the site of an earlier fortification, it is a castle in name only as it is a grand Tudor fortified manor house built in courtyard style.

The castle
A charter of 1306 granted in Swansea refers to tenants of "the ancient knight's fees" (that is, military tenants) at Oxwich, and this indicates that there may have been some fortifications on the site before the present castle. At this time Oxwich was owned by the de Penres family, who had been in possession since the 1230s. However, with the exception of a ruined tower to the north-east of the castle, which may predate the Tudor building, (and may be the "castrum de Oxenwych" mentioned in a document of 1459) nothing remains of any earlier works.

The existing buildings were largely created in the 16th century. They consist of a Gateway (built 1520–1538) leading to a courtyard, a Hall at the east of the courtyard opposite the Gateway (1559–1580) and a South Range (1520–38). At the corner of the Hall and the South Range is the six-story South-East Tower. To the north-east of the Castle are the remains of a large stone dovecote.

The Gateway is surmounted by a plaque with the coats of arms of the Mansell family and the Penrice and Scurlage families to which Sir Rhys was related. The East Range carried a large Hall, and, with the South-East Tower to which it was connected, provided extensive accommodation. It is possible that the construction of this range may have led to the bankruptcy of its builder, Sir Edward Mansell. The South Range contained a kitchen.

History
Oxwich was originally built by Sir Rice Mansel (d. 1559), who also owned Old Beaupre Castle. The structure was built over the original ruined castle, the residence of the Norman de la Mare family during the 13th and 14th century. His son, Sir Edward Mansel (d. 1595) succeeded to the property and between 1560 and 1580 created a much grander structure, called the Great House, capable of housing a large number of guests and retainers. It was a leading example in Wales of the Elizabethan prodigy house. By 1632 however the Castle was already leased out by the Mansell family. Parts of the building collapsed in the eighteenth century. Following this, parts of the South Range were rebuilt and it continued to be used as a farmhouse into the 20th century. In 1949 the Castle was threatened with demolition but was saved and given to the State. The building is now in the care of Cadw.

The Oxwich Brooch
During maintenance works at the Castle in 1968, a gold brooch was discovered by Cyril Grove,  which is a rare fine example of medieval British jewellery. The brooch is in the form of a gold ring with mounts, of the period 1320–1340, two inches in diameter. It is set with three rubies and three cameos; it is believed that the cameos were added at a later date and that the brooch may have originally contained sapphires. It may once have been part of the treasure of Edward II or an heirloom of the Mansel family. The brooch is now on display at the National Museum Cardiff.

References
Notes

Sources
Hughes, Wendy. (1992). The Story of Gower. Orsaf, Llanrwst: Gwasg Carreg Gwalch. 
Williams, Diane M. (1998). Gower: A Guide to Ancient and Historic Monuments on The Gower Peninsula. Cardiff: CADW. 
Hughes, Wendy. (1992). The Story of Gower. Orsaf, Llanrwst: Gwasg Carreg Gwalch.

External links 

"Oxwich Castle" in Cadw website, accessed 26 March 2016
"Oxwich Castle"  in Castles of Wales website, accessed 26 March 2016

Castles in Swansea
Grade I listed buildings in Swansea
Country houses in Wales
Castle ruins in Wales
Grade I listed castles in Wales